Daniel Potts may refer to:

Daniel Potts (Shortland Street), fictional character in the soap opera Shortland Street
Dan Potts (footballer) (born 1994), English footballer
Danny Potts, child actor in the film Greystoke: The Legend of Tarzan, Lord of the Apes